The 1995 Southwest Conference men's basketball tournament was held March 10–0, 1995, at Reunion Arena in Dallas, Texas. 

Number 1 seed  defeated 2 seed Texas Tech 107-104 (OT) to win their 2nd championship and receive the conference's automatic bid to the 1995 NCAA tournament.

Format and seeding 
The tournament consisted of the top 7 teams playing in a single-elimination tournament. The #1 seeded team received a first round bye.

Tournament

References 

1994–95 Southwest Conference men's basketball season
Basketball in the Dallas–Fort Worth metroplex
Southwest Conference men's basketball tournament